Ocean Spray Cranberries, Inc. is an American agricultural cooperative of growers of cranberries headquartered in Plymouth County, Massachusetts. It currently has over 700 member growers (in Massachusetts, Wisconsin, New Jersey, Oregon, Washington, Florida, British Columbia and other parts of Canada, as well as Chile). The cooperative employs about 2,000 people, with sales of $1.2 billion in fiscal year 2013 and accounts for 70% of North American cranberry production.  Their products include cranberry sauce, fruit juices, fruit snacks, and dried cranberries.

The cooperative has made a number of innovations, including the first juice blend, the first juice boxes, and sweetened dried cranberries (Craisins). Its cranberry juice won the ChefsBest Award for best taste.

History
Ocean Spray was formed in 1930, in Hanson, Massachusetts, by three cranberry growers who wanted to expand their market for cranberries. Led by growers Marcus L. Urann, Elizabeth F. Lee and John C. Makepeace, who had created a cranberry sauce, the cooperative developed more cranberry-based products. In the same year Ocean Spray became the first producer of cranberry juice drinks with the introduction of Cranberry Juice Cocktail. (A.D. Makepeace Company, one of the original founders of Ocean Spray, has been in continual operation since the late 19th century and is currently the world's largest grower of cranberries.)

In 1963, executive Edward Gelsthorpe worked with Sylvia Schur to develop Cranapple juice, a product that brought the cranberry to greater popularity and increased usage to year-round, earning Gelsthorpe the nickname "Cranapple Ed".

In 1976, the cooperative expanded its membership to grapefruit growers in Florida. In September 1976, the headquarters was moved from Hanson to Plymouth, Massachusetts.

In 1989, the Ocean Spray headquarters was moved to its current location of a building on the Lakeville-Middleborough town line.

In June 2004, Ocean Spray members voted down a joint venture of the cooperative's beverage business with PepsiCo. Pepsi had offered the co-op $100 million, an assumption of debt and fixed prices for cranberry harvests. In July 2006, the cooperative signed a 25-year single-serve (machine-dispensed) juice distribution deal with Pepsi.

In September 2004, Ocean Spray agreed to purchase the processing assets of Northland Cranberry. This acquisition included a juice production facility in Wisconsin Rapids, Wisconsin.

Ocean Spray completed expansion of the Wisconsin Rapids processing plant in September 2008. The plant has numerous environmentally friendly features including a wastewater treatment facility, energy-efficient lighting, and the use of methane from the nearby Veolia Cranberry Creek Landfill for boiler fuel. With the addition, the plant will produce Craisins, in addition to currently produced juice concentrates.

Throughout 2012, Ocean Spray contributed $387,100 to a $46 million political campaign known as "The Coalition Against The Costly Food Labeling Proposition, sponsored by Farmers and Food Producers". This organization was set up to oppose a citizen's initiative, known as Proposition 37, demanding mandatory labeling of foods containing genetically modified ingredients.

Ocean Spray has juice-filling facilities in Henderson, Nevada; Sulphur Springs, Texas; Allentown, Pennsylvania; and Kenosha, Wisconsin.

In October 2020, Ocean Spray gained media attention when Nathan Apodaca made a TikTok video that went viral featuring the Fleetwood Mac 1977 hit "Dreams" while drinking a bottle of Ocean Spray and riding his skateboard.

Controversies 

In June 2006, at the request of People for the Ethical Treatment of Animals (PETA) Ocean Spray agreed to end its support for animal experiments. Previously, Ocean Spray had funded tests involving infecting mice with H. pylori, bacteria that cause stomach ulcers, and then feeding them cranberry juice to see if it had any positive effect.  These experiments were conducted to determine the usefulness of Ocean Spray's cranberry juice as a digestif.

In January 2020, Ocean Spray settled a class-action lawsuit that claimed its products were misleading in advertising that they do not contain artificial flavors, since they contain malic acid and/or fumaric acid. The company agreed to pay $5.4 million dollars to claimants.

In February 2020, Ocean Spray dismissed its president and CEO, Bobby Chacko, for violating the company's harassment policy.

See also

Further reading

References

External links

 

Business services companies established in 1930
Agricultural cooperatives in the United States
Agricultural marketing cooperatives
Food manufacturers of the United States
Juice brands
Companies based in Plymouth County, Massachusetts
Food and drink companies based in Massachusetts
Lakeville, Massachusetts
American companies established in 1930
Food and drink companies established in 1930
Products introduced in 1930
1930 establishments in Massachusetts
Agriculture in Massachusetts
American brands
Agricultural marketing in the United States
Cranberries